Tarreh Dan (also Romanized as Tarreh Dān and Tareh Dān) is a village in Kuhmareh Rural District, Kuhmareh District, Kazerun County, Fars Province, Iran. At the 2006 census, its population was 1,184, in 255 families.

References 

Populated places in Chenar Shahijan County